Shakhrisabz (shahr-i sabz (city of green / verdant city)), is a city in Qashqadaryo Region in southern Uzbekistan

Shakhrisabz or Shakhrisabz may also refer to:

Shakhrisabz District, Uzbekistan
Shakhrisabz Suzani, a type of Uzbek textile